Gustav Ernst (born 23 August 1944) is an Austrian playwright, novelist and screenwriter. He has also founded and edited two literary journals, Wespennest and kolik.

Ernst was born in Vienna, where he read Philosophy, Psychology and History at the University of Vienna. He lives in Leopoldstadt.

Selected works

Plays

 Ein irrer Haß (1979)
 Mallorca (1986)
 Herzgruft (1988)
 Blutbad (1990)
 Herz ist Trumpf (1990)
 1000 Rosen (1990)
 Ein Volksfreund (1994)
 Casino (1998)

Novels

 Einsame Klasse (1979)
 Frühling in der Via Condotti (1987)
 Trennungen (2000)
 Grado. Süße Nacht (2004)
 Grundlsee (2013)

External links
 Complete bibliography
 The kolik homepage

1944 births
Living people
Austrian male writers